Miguel "Reko" Gonçalves Silva (born 21 June 1999) is a Portuguese professional footballer who plays for Torreense.

References

1999 births
People from Barcelos, Portugal
Living people
Portuguese footballers
Association football midfielders
C.D. Aves players
Portimonense S.C. players
C.F. Estrela da Amadora players
Primeira Liga players
Liga Portugal 2 players
Sportspeople from Braga District